Outside the Box is the second and latest album by British dubstep producer Skream, released on 9 August 2010 on Tempa records. The album features collaborations with electropop duo La Roux and American rapper Murs, amongst others. Two singles were released from the album: "Listenin' To The Records On My Wall" and "Where You Should Be" (the latter featuring singer Sam Frank).

Critical reception

At Metacritic, which assigns a rating out of 100 using reviews from mainstream critics, the album received an average score of 76 based on 13 reviews (which indicates "generally favourable reviews"). Alexis Petridis of The Guardian gave the album four out of five stars, praising Skream for "trying to do something different" and "push at the boundaries of his chosen genre". He was, however, critical of the track "Wibbler", branding it "not so much a piece of music as a splitting headache waiting to happen". Chris Power of the BBC gave the album a mixed review, asking "where's the creative reward in rehashing old tricks?"

Track listing

CD

Skreamizm bonus CD
The deluxe edition of the album comes with a second CD, containing 6 additional tracks.

Vinyl track listing

In popular culture
The song "Listenin' To The Records on My Wall" was featured in the video game, DiRT 3.

References

External links
SI Special: Give Up Art x Skream

2010 albums
Skream albums